St. Sava Orthodox School is a Serbian-American private school located in the Milwaukee Wisconsin, United States. The school offers a preschool and schooling for children in Kindergarten to the 8th grade. The school works in tandem with the Serbian Orthodox Church, and seeks to promote bilingual education and cultural growth to the city's Serbian community. Instruction is in Serbian and English.

The school was established in 1997, making it the oldest daily Serbian school in the United States.

Students at St. Sava Orthodox School are encouraged to take advantage of the extracurricular activities available. Some of them include: academic competitions, athletics, and folklore.

There is another Serbian-American day school, the St. Sava Academy, in Chicago.

See also
St. Sava Academy
Serbian Americans

External links
 School website

Private middle schools in Wisconsin
Private elementary schools in Wisconsin
Serbian-American culture
Serbian schools outside Serbia
Educational institutions established in 1997
Education in Milwaukee
1997 establishments in Wisconsin